was a  pre-dreadnought battleship built for the Imperial Japanese Navy (IJN) in the late 1890s. As Japan lacked the industrial capacity to build such warships, the ship was designed and built in the United Kingdom. She participated in the early stages of the Russo-Japanese War of 1904–1905, including the Battle of Port Arthur on the second day of the war, as the flagship of the 1st Division. Hatsuse was involved in the subsequent operations until she struck two mines off Port Arthur in May 1904. The second mine detonated one of her magazines and Hatsuse sank almost immediately afterwards with the loss of over half her crew.

Description
The Shikishima class was an improved version of the s of the United Kingdom's Royal Navy. At this time, Japan lacked the technology and capability to construct its own battleships and they had to be built abroad. She displaced  at normal load and had a crew of 849 officers and ratings when serving as a flagship. The ship was powered by two Humphrys Tennant vertical triple-expansion steam engines, each driving one shaft, using steam provided by 25 Belleville boilers.

The ships' main battery consisted of four  guns mounted in two twin gun turrets, one forward and one aft of the superstructure. Their secondary armament consisted of fourteen quick-firing (QF)  guns, mounted in casemates on the sides of the hull and in the superstructure. A suite of smaller guns were carried for defence against torpedo boats. These included twenty QF 12-pounder 12 cwt guns, eight  3-pounders and four 2.5-pounder Hotchkiss guns of the same calibre, all of which were in single mounts. They was also armed with four submerged 18-inch (450 mm) torpedo tubes, two on each broadside.

Construction and career

Hatsuse, named after the Hase-dera temple, which was famous for its maple trees, was ordered as part of a 10-year Naval Expansion Programme paid for from the £30,000,000 indemnity paid by China after losing the Sino-Japanese War of 1894–1895. The ship was laid down by Armstrong Whitworth at their Elswick shipyard on 10 January 1898. She was launched on 27 June 1899 and completed on 18 January 1901. Before sailing to Japan, she represented the Meiji Emperor at Queen Victoria's funeral on 2 February. She arrived in Singapore on 28 March where she restocked with coal, received a change of paint from grey to black and then departed on 3 April bound for Yokosuka.

At the start of the Russo-Japanese War, Hatsuse, commanded by Captain Yu Nakao, was assigned to the 1st Division of the 1st Fleet and became the flagship of its commander, Rear-Admiral Nashiba Tokioki. She participated in the Battle of Port Arthur on 9 February 1904 when Vice-Admiral Tōgō Heihachirō led the 1st Fleet in an attack on the Russian ships of the Pacific Squadron anchored just outside Port Arthur. Tōgō had expected his surprise night attack on the Russians by his destroyers to be much more successful than it actually was and anticipated that they would be badly disorganised and weakened, but the Russians had recovered from their surprise and were ready for his attack. The Japanese ships were spotted by the cruiser  which was patrolling offshore and alerted the Russian defences. Tōgō chose to attack the Russian coastal defences with his main armament and engage the Russian ships with his secondary guns. Splitting his fire proved to be a bad idea as the Japanese  and six-inch guns inflicted little damage on the Russian ships who concentrated all their fire on the Japanese ships with some effect. Although a large number of ships on both sides were hit, Russian casualties numbered only 17 while the Japanese suffered 60 killed and wounded before Tōgō disengaged. Hatsuse was hit twice during the battle, losing seven crewmen killed and seventeen wounded.

Hatsuse participated in the action of 13 April when Tōgō successfully lured out a portion of the Pacific Squadron, including Vice-Admiral Stepan Makarov's flagship, the battleship . When Makarov spotted the five battleships of the 1st Division, he turned back for Port Arthur and Petropavlovsk struck a minefield laid by the Japanese the previous night. The Russian battleship sank in less than two minutes after one of her magazines exploded, with Makarov one of the 677 killed. Emboldened by his success, Tōgō resumed long-range bombardment missions, which prompted the Russians to lay more minefields.

On the following morning, the squadron encountered a minefield laid by the Russian minelayer Amur. Hatsuse struck one mine that disabled her steering at 10:50 and Yashima struck another when moving to assist Hatsuse. Tatsuta and Kasagi managed to save Nashiba and Nakao with 334 other officers and ratings. Yashimas flooding could not be controlled and she foundered about eight hours later, after her crew had abandoned ship.

Notes

Footnotes

References

Further reading

External links

 Hatsuse on Tyne Built Ships

Shikishima-class battleships
Ships built by Armstrong Whitworth
Ships built on the River Tyne
1899 ships
Russo-Japanese War battleships of Japan
Ships sunk by mines
Shipwrecks in the East China Sea
Shipwrecks of China
Shipwrecks of the Russo-Japanese War
Naval magazine explosions